Girl Asleep is a 2015 Australian surrealist coming-of-age drama film written by Matthew Whittet and directed by Rosemary Myers.  The film has been described as an extroverted fantasy dreamscape of an introverted teenage girl. The film is an adaptation of the successful theatre production, also written by Matthew Whittet, by Windmill Theatre in 2014 of the same name, that premiered at the Adelaide Festival. The cast includes: Bethany Whitmore, Tilda Cobham-Hervey,
Imogen Archer, Harrison Feldman, Amber McMahon, Eamon Farren, scriptwriter Matthew Whittet and Maiah Stewardson.

Girl Asleep showed at the 2016 Berlin International Film Festival to critical acclaim, and garnered the top prize at CinefestOZ, the richest film prize in Australia.

Plot
In the late 1970s, 14-year old Greta Driscoll arrives at a new school. She is immediately befriended by the overenthusiastic Elliott, whom she likes, and is also approached by a group of sophisticated girls, Jade, Sapphire and Amber, who pressure her into friendship even though she doesn't like them.

Greta's mother worries that she has no friends and decides to invite her whole school to her fifteenth birthday party. Though Greta is extremely opposed to the idea, she eventually allows her mother to proceed with her plan. The day of the party Greta is surprised to find herself having fun but is yanked away from the party by Amber and her friends who give her a song they have recorded where they mock her body. Running away crying Greta is approached by Elliott who confesses he has a crush on her. Greta cruelly shuts him down.

Shortly afterwards Greta notices a strange creature in her room who has stolen her music box. Chasing it, she finds herself lured into the forest behind her house where menacing creatures lurk. As she is about to be attacked she meets the Huldra who rescues her. After being separated from the Huldra, Greta tries to find her music box and is instead frozen by a woman smashing various music boxes. She is once again rescued by the Huldra who throws her back into her world. After fighting off evil versions of Amber, Jade and Sapphire, Greta finds the creature who stole her music box and discovers the creature is actually her child self.

Awakening in her bedroom, Greta is met by her older sister who comforts her and tells her that while her current age is an awkward one she is not alone. Greta returns to the party where she apologises to Elliott and she asks him to switch clothes so that she can abandon the uncomfortable dress her mother forced her to wear. Decked out in Elliot's suit, Greta blows out her candles and celebrates her 15th birthday.

Cast
 Bethany Whitmore as Greta
 Harrison Feldman as Elliott
 Imogen Archer as Genevieve
 Tilda Cobham-Hervey as The Huldra
 Eamon Farren as Adam / Benoit Tremet
 Matthew Whittet as Conrad / Abject Man
 Amber McMahon as Janet / Frozen Woman
 Maiah Stewardson as Jade
 Fiona Dawson as Sapphire
 Grace Dawson as Amber
 Lucy Cowan as Little Greta
 Ellen Steele as Miss Shiswick
 Danielle Catanzariti as Denise Mackel

Production
The film received funding from Windmill Theatre, South Australian Film Corporation, The Ian Potter Foundation and The Hive Production Fund, a unique initiative of the Adelaide Film Festival in partnership with the Australia Council for the Arts, Screen Australia and ABC Arts.

The film was primarily shot in Adelaide, South Australia, with most of the interior and forest shots filmed at Anomaly Studios. Other locations include Findon High School, Blackwood Forest, Bonython Park and a private house in the suburb of Panorama.

Reception

Critical response
On Rotten Tomatoes, which categorizes reviews only as positive or negative, 82% of 38 reviews of the film are positive; the average rating is 6.70/10. The website's critics consensus reads, "Girl Asleep takes a singularly quirky look at adolescence with a distinctive visual style and a refreshing perspective that belies the story's period setting." According to Metacritic, which compiled 12 reviews and calculated a weighted average score of 67 out of 100, the film received "generally favorable reviews".

Jane Howard of The Guardian praises the film giving it 4 out of 5 stars and said that "It’s remarkable how comfortable the oddities we might associate with theatre sit on the screen". and further stating "The rich colours popping from cinematographer Andrew Commis’s 4:3 aspect ratio draw us back into an Australia of the past. Production and costume designer Jonathon Oxlade also embraces the 70s in all of its oddities and excess. And yet Myers always grounds her characters and their stories in a recognisable reality, drawing out delicate and nuanced performances. Even when the fantasy and magic reaches a peak, we still feel passionately engaged with the humanity."
Simon Foster of Screen-Space gave the film 4.5 out of 5 stars and said "As Greta embraces her blossoming self, so to does Australian cinema welcome another memorable movie heroine."
Cat Kusmuk-Dodd of The Upside News states "Both Greta’s journey through her everyday life and into her imaginary world make for a visually pleasing experience, the latter enchanting us with the appearance of creatures similar to those in The Mighty Boosh. The excessive timber décor and brightly coloured wallpaper in the Driscoll’s family home would not seem out of place in Napoleon Dynamite."

Accolades

References

External links
 Official website 
 
 Girl Asleep at Windmill Theatre

2015 films
Australian drama films
Films set in the 1970s
Films shot in Adelaide
Fiction about origami
2015 directorial debut films
2015 drama films
2010s English-language films